Mary Cromwell, Countess Fauconberg (9 February 1637 (christened) – 14 March 1713) was an English noblewoman, the third daughter of Oliver Cromwell and his wife Elizabeth Bourchier.

Biography 

Born in either late 1636 or early 1637, Mary Cromwell was christened on 9 February 1637. On 19 November 1657 she married Thomas Belasyse, 1st Earl Fauconberg, at Hampton Court, and became Countess Fauconberg. Fauconberg had been previously married to Mildred Saunderson, who had died. Lady Fauconberg's residence in London was Fauconberg House which was on the north side of Sutton Street, and on the eastern side of Soho Square. 

It has been claimed that, when her father's body was disinterred and symbolically executed at the Restoration, Mary bribed some guards to substitute another body for Cromwell's and to give her the real body, which she arranged to have buried at Newburgh Priory, the family seat of the Fauconbergs.

She died on 14 March 1713 in Sutton Manor at the age of 76, and was buried on 24 March in the church of St. Nicholas Church, Chiswick, the district where she had lived since 1676.

References
Footnotes

Sources

1630s births
1713 deaths
English countesses
Mary
17th-century English women
17th-century English nobility
18th-century English women
18th-century English nobility
Children of Oliver Cromwell